Sanam Krishan Singh (born 11 January 1988), is a former Indian tennis player. Singh won the doubles gold medal and the bronze in the team event at the 2010 Asian Games. He added another Asian Games medal to his tally by winning the Silver medal in Doubles in the 2014 Asian Games held at Incheon. Singh played college tennis at the University of Virginia between 2007 and 2011. Singh is currently an assistant Tennis coach at Harvard University.

Early career
Singh ranked fourth in the ITF junior rankings in 2005. Played all four junior grand slams. He reached at the round of 16 at the Junior Australian Open, Junior Wimbledon, 2005 Asian Closed Junior Championship and Asia/Oceania Closed Championship singles champion. In 2007, he reached the quarter-finals of a Futures Circuit event in India.

References

External links
 
 
 

Living people
1988 births
Asian Games medalists in tennis
Indian expatriates in the United States
Indian male tennis players
Racket sportspeople from Chandigarh
Virginia Cavaliers men's tennis players
Tennis players at the 2010 Asian Games
Tennis players at the 2014 Asian Games
Asian Games silver medalists for India
Asian Games gold medalists for India
Asian Games bronze medalists for India
Medalists at the 2010 Asian Games
Medalists at the 2014 Asian Games
South Asian Games silver medalists for India
South Asian Games medalists in tennis